Heterokrohniidae is a family of sagittoideans in the order Phragmophora.

Genera
Archeterokrohnia Casanova, 1986
Heterokrohnia von Ritter-Záhony, 1911
Xenokrohnia Casanova, 1993

References

Chaetognatha
Protostome families